The 1941 Oklahoma Sooners football team represented the University of Oklahoma in the 1941 college football season. In their first year under head coach Dewey Luster, the Sooners compiled a 6–3 record (3–2 against conference opponents), finished in a tie for second place in the Big Six Conference, and outscored their opponents by a combined total of 218 to 95.

No Sooners received All-America honors in 1941, but two Oklahoma players were selected by the United Press as first-team players on the 1941 All-Big Six Conference football team: senior tackle Roger Eason and senior fullback Jack Jacobs. Two others (halfback Orville Mathews and guard Ralph Harris) were named to the second team.

Schedule

NFL Draft
The following players were drafted into the National Football League following the season.

References

Oklahoma
Oklahoma Sooners football seasons
Oklahoma Sooners football